Online matchmaking may refer to:

 Online dating service
 Matchmaking (video games)